Eucrotala is a genus of moths belonging to the family Tineidae.

Species
Eucrotala nucleata Meyrick, 1917
Eucrotala tetracola Meyrick, 1919

References

Tineidae
Tineidae genera
Taxa named by Edward Meyrick